The Old Manor in Croscombe, Somerset, England, was built around 1460–89 as a rectorial manor house for Hugh Sugar, the Treasurer of Wells Cathedral. It was altered in the 16th and 18th centuries, and in the 20th century by the Landmark Trust. It has been designated as a Grade I listed building.

See also
 List of Grade I listed buildings in Mendip

References

Houses completed in the 15th century
Grade I listed buildings in Mendip District
Grade I listed houses in Somerset